Results and statistics for the 2006 Claxton Shield

Results

Round 1: Saturday, 21 January 2006

Round 2: Sunday, 22 January 2006

Round 3: Monday, 23 January 2006

Round 4: Tuesday, 24 January 2006

Round 5: Wednesday, 25 January 2006

Final standings

Finals

Semi-finals

Grand final

External links
 Information and Results on 2006 Claxton Shield
 Queensland Win 2006 Claxton Shield

Claxton Shield
Claxton Shield
January 2006 sports events in Australia